This is a list of Thai khanom, comprising snacks and desserts that are a part of Thai cuisine. Some of these dishes are also a part of other cuisines. The word "khanom", refers to snack or dessert, presumably being a compound between two words, "khao" (ข้าว), "rice" and "khnom" (หนม), "sweet". The word "khanom" in the Thai sense is snack or sweet food made from flour.

Thai khanom

 Bua Loy, rice flour rolled into small balls and then cooked in coconut milk.
 Bulan dan mek
 Lot chong 
 Cha mongkut 
 Fakthong kaeng buat  
 Foi thong 
 Fresh fruit
 Grass jelly 
 Khanom babin 
 Khanom bueang – known as Thai crêpes
 Khanom chan – means layer dessert
 Khanom keson lamchiak
 Khanom khai pla
 Khanom khrok 
 Khanom khuai ling
 Khanom mo kaeng 
 Khanom namdokmai 
 Khanom phing 
 Khanom piakpun 
 Khanom sane chan 
 Khanom sot sai 
 Khanom tan 
 Khanom thang taek 
 Khanom thian
 Khanom tom
 Khao mak 
 Khao tom 
 Kluai buat chi
 Kluai chueam
 Krayasat 
 Luk chup 
 Mango sticky rice
 Namtan pan 
 Nine auspicious Thai desserts – served on special occasions such as weddings, housewarmings, or ordinations, they confer blessings on the recipient
 O-eo 
 Sago with coconut milk
 Sangkhaya fakthong
 Thapthim krop 
 Thong ek 
 Thong yip 
 Thong yot
 Thua khiao tom namtan

See also

 List of desserts
 List of Thai dishes
 Maria Guyomar de Pinha – known in Thailand for having introduced new dessert recipes in Siamese cuisine at the Ayutthaya court.

References

External links
 

 
Dessert-related lists